The Kill Team is a 2013 American documentary film directed by Dan Krauss about the Maywand District murders during the War in Afghanistan. The film won first place in the category of Best Documentary Feature at the 2013 Tribeca Film Festival.

Krauss later directed The Kill Team (2019), a narrative drama film about the murders.

Summary 
This documentary exposes the stresses and aggressions of soldiers at war, in which a few are driven by boredom, anger, hatred, social pressure, or sociopathy to commit war crimes. Private Adam Winfield was a 21-year-old soldier in Afghanistan when he attempted with the help of his father to alert the military to the murders his platoon was committing. But Winfield's pleas went unheeded. Pressured by threats to his life from his superior and other members of his unit, Winfield was drawn into a moral abyss and forced to make a split-second decision that changed his life forever. The film follows him and his family through wartime events and the legal proceedings that followed, interspersed with interviews of the soldiers in his platoon and photos and video footage from Afghanistan.

References

External links

2013 films
2013 documentary films
2010s American films
2010s English-language films
American documentary films
Documentary films about the United States Army
Documentary films about the War in Afghanistan (2001–2021)
Documentary films about war crimes
Films directed by Dan Krauss